Malang Station is a railway station in Malang City, East Java. The station is located at an altitude of approximately +444 meters amsl. It is the largest train station in Malang City. The existing building of Malang station was built in 1941 based on the work of J. van der Eb. The station is sometimes referred to as Malang Kotabaru Station to distinguish it from the original 1879 building of Malang station (not Malang Kotalama Station).

Originally, Malang Station was on the east side, from where the building is now. Because that building was considered to be unable to accommodate the increasing number of passengers, a new, larger building was made on the west side. The new building continues to be used up to now and the old building that is now adjacent to the train depot and locomotive Malang functions as an office and warehouse for storing railway maintenance tools.

Services

The railway services that are used in this station are:

Intercity services

Local services

References

External links
 

Malang
Railway stations in East Java
Railway stations opened in 1879